The 30th edition of the World Allround Speed Skating Championships for Women took place on 1 and 2 February 1969 in Grenoble at the L'Anneau de Vitesse ice rink.

Title holder was the Netherlander Stien Kaiser.

Distance medalists

Classification

 DNF = Did not finish

Source:

References

Attribution
In Dutch

1960s in speed skating
1960s in women's speed skating
1969 World Allround
1969 in women's speed skating